Ottmann is a surname. Notable people with the surname include:

Klaus Ottmann, German writer and curator
Patrick Ottmann, French footballer
Henry Ottmann, French painter

See also
Bentley–Ottmann algorithm, mathematical algorithm
Ottman, surname

Surnames from given names